German U15 e.V. is an association of fifteen major research-intensive and leading medical universities in Germany with a full disciplinary spectrum, excluding any defining engineering sciences.

The governing body is the University of Mainz, represented by President Georg Krausch; the deputy governing body is the University of Bonn, represented by Rector Michael Hoch. The managing director is Jan Wöpking.

The association's headquarters are in Berlin. 

U15 has been a member of the Global Network of Research Universities since November 2014. The network includes the Russell Group (Great Britain, headquartered in London), Association of American Universities (United States of America, headquartered in Washington D.C.), League of European Research Universities (Europe, headquartered in Leuven/Belgium), Association of East Asian Research Universities (Chinese mainland, Japan, South Korea, Hong Kong und Taiwan), C9 League (China), Group of Eight (Australia, headquartered in Canberra), RU11 (Japan), and the U15 Group of Canadian Research Universities (Canada, headquartered in Ottawa).

Members

 Free University of Berlin
 Humboldt University of Berlin
 University of Bonn
 Goethe University of Frankfurt
 University of Freiburg
 University of Göttingen
 University of Hamburg
 Heidelberg University
 University of Cologne
 University of Leipzig
 University of Mainz
 Ludwig Maximilian University of Munich
 University of Münster
 University of Tübingen
 University of Würzburg

See also
 TU9 - association of nine largest technical universities in Germany
National Institutes of Technology - 31 leading public engineering universities in India
 Golden Triangle (English universities) - a group of leading English universities
 Russell Group – A group of research-based universities in the United Kingdom
 C9 League, alliance of top universities in China

External links
 Official website

Notes and references 

College and university associations and consortia in Germany